Banque Internationale à Luxembourg S.A. (BIL, "International Bank in Luxembourg") is the oldest private bank in Luxembourg. It offers commercial and corporate banking services. Since 2018, it has been majority-owned by China-headquartered Legend Holdings.

History

Founded on 8 March 1856, the bank was a major bank of Luxembourg. The bank's first counter opened on 31 July 1856. Deposits reached a million francs in 1869 and 100 million in 1916.

Like other banks in the German Confederation, BIL issued banknotes in multiple currencies including the Belgian franc, Dutch guilder, Prussian thaler, and Rhineland thaler. In 1914, the BIL’s notes became legal tender in Luxembourg.

 was CEO of the bank from 1973 to 1989. In 1982, it opened a subsidiary in Singapore. In 1983, Groupe Bruxelles Lambert and Pargesa Holding, both controlled by Belgian financier Albert Frère, in turn acquired minority stakes in the equity of BIL. In 1991, Crédit Communal de Belgique acquired 25 percent of the capital of BIL, and in 1992 raised its stake to 51 percent. In 1998, BIL acquired the Banque Industrielle et Immobilière Privée (BIMP). Crédit Communal de Belgique, which had become Dexia in 1996, acquired full ownership of BIL in 1999. In the 2000, the Dexia brand replaced the former BIL identity.

In 1997, BIL opened new branches in Dublin, Singapore and the Cayman Islands to "satisfy a new demand [...] in cross-cultural transactions".

In 2011,  was appointed CEO of Dexia BIL. In 2012 Dexia sold BIL for €730 million to Precision Capital, which also owned KBL European Private Bankers. In 2014, Hugues Delcourt was appointed CEO of BIL. In 2015, the BIL closed its Singapore subsidiary.

In 2017, the Chinese investment company Legend Holdings announced it was acquiring Precision Capital's 90% stake in the bank for €1.484 billion. In July 2018, the acquisition, notified through the Luxembourg regulator (CSSF), was approved by the European Central Bank.

In 2020, the bank reported a decrease of 10% of its annual results.

Controversy

In August 2020, Luxembourg’s Commission de Surveillance du Secteur Financier imposed a large fine of 4.6 million euro on BIL, following inspection of the bank’s AMLCFT systems in 2017 and 2018.

See also
 List of banks in Luxembourg
 Banque et Caisse d'Épargne de l'État

References

External links
 

Banks of Luxembourg
1856 establishments in Luxembourg
Banks established in 1856
Banks under direct supervision of the European Central Bank